Epilecta is a genus of moths of the family Noctuidae. It consists of only one species, Epilecta linogrisea.

References
Natural History Museum Lepidoptera genus database
Epilecta at funet

Noctuinae